Nieuwveen is a town in the Dutch province of South Holland, located close to the border of province North Holland, about 35 kilometers (22 miles) southwest of the city of Amsterdam. It is a part of the municipality of Nieuwkoop (until 2007: Liemeer), and lies about 9 kilometers (6 miles) northeast of Alphen aan den Rijn.

In 2001, the town of Nieuwveen had 2806 inhabitants. The built-up area of the town was 0.73 km², and contained 931 residences.
The statistical area "Nieuwveen", which also can include the peripheral parts of the village, as well as the surrounding countryside, has a population of around 3630.

Zevenhoven was added to the municipality of Nieuwveen in 1991, and the municipality was renamed Liemeer in 1994. The Jostiband Orchestra was founded here.

References

Populated places in South Holland
Former municipalities of South Holland
Municipalities of the Netherlands disestablished in 1994
Geography of Nieuwkoop